Iais is a genus of crustaceans.

IAIS may refer to:

International Association of Insurance Supervisors
Iowa Interstate Railroad
Israeli Association for International Studies